The Kazakh Autonomous Socialist Soviet Republic, abbreviated as Kazak ASSR and simply Kazakhstan, was an autonomous republic of the Soviet Union within the Russian Soviet Federative Socialist Republic (RSFSR) existing from 1920 until 1936.

History
The Kazakh ASSR was originally created as the Kirghiz Autonomous Socialist Soviet Republic (not to be confused with Kirghiz ASSR of 1926–1936, a Central Asian territory which is now the independent state of Kyrgyzstan) on 26 August 1920 and was an autonomous republic within the Russian Socialist Federative Soviet Republic.

Before the Russian Revolution, Kazakhs in Russia were known as "Kirghiz-Kazaks" or simply "Kirghiz" (and the Kyrgyzes as "Kara-Kirghiz"). This practice continued into the early Soviet period, and thus the Kirghiz ASSR was a national republic for Kazakhs. However, on 15–19 June 1925 the Fifth Kazakh Council of Soviets decided to rename the republic the Kazak Autonomous Socialist Soviet Republic. The capital of the former Kirghiz ASSR, Ak-Mechet, was retained as the seat of the Kazak ASSR but was renamed Kzyl-Orda, from the Kazakh "red centre". In 1927 or 1929 the city of Alma-Ata was designated as the new capital of the ASSR. In February 1930, there was an anti-Soviet insurgency in the village of Sozak. On 5 December 1936, the ASSR was detached from the RSFSR and made the Kazakh Soviet Socialist Republic, a full union republic of the Soviet Union.

Geography

The Kazak ASSR that succeeded the recently expanded Kirghiz ASSR included all of the territory making up the present-day Republic of Kazakhstan plus parts of Uzbekistan (the Karakalpak Autonomous Oblast), Turkmenistan (the north shore of Kara-Bogaz-Gol) and Russia (parts of what would become Orenburg Oblast). These territories were transferred from the Kazak ASSR over the following decade.

The administrative subdivisions of the ASSR changed several times in its history. In 1928 the guberniyas, administrative districts inherited from the Kirghiz ASSR were eliminated and replaced with 13 okrugs and raions. In 1932, the republic was divided into six new larger oblasts. These included:
Aktyubinsk Oblast (capital: Aktyubinsk);
Alma-Ata (capital: Alma-Ata);
East Kazak Oblast (capital: Semipalatinsk);
Karaganda Oblast (capital: Petropavlovsk);
South Kazak Oblast (capital: Chimkent);
West Kazak Oblast (capital: Uralsk).
On 31 January 1935, yet another territorial division was implemented which included the six oblasts listed above plus a new Karkaralinsk okrug.

Notes

References

Autonomous republics of the Russian Soviet Federative Socialist Republic
Kazakh
Kazakh
1936 disestablishments in the Soviet Union
Kazakh
Communism in Kyrgyzstan
Communism in Kazakhstan
Kazakh